S Bridge was a historic stone arch bridge located at Marion Township in Berks County, Pennsylvania. It was a multiple span , stone arch bridge with three spans, constructed in 1919. It crossed Tulpehocken Creek.

It was listed on the National Register of Historic Places in 1988. In 2001, the bridge was closed when one of the bridge walls began to separate from an arch. After a decade of disuse, it was demolished and replaced with a concrete span in 2011.

See also
List of bridges documented by the Historic American Engineering Record in Pennsylvania

References

External links

Bridges completed in 1919
Bridges in Berks County, Pennsylvania
Buildings and structures demolished in 2011
Historic American Engineering Record in Pennsylvania
National Register of Historic Places in Berks County, Pennsylvania
Road bridges on the National Register of Historic Places in Pennsylvania
Stone arch bridges in the United States